James Winchester may refer to:

 James Winchester (general) (1752–1826), an American Revolutionary War officer and brigadier general during the War of 1812
 James Winchester (Maryland judge) (1772–1806), Maryland politician and judge
 James R. Winchester (born 1952), Justice of the Oklahoma Supreme Court 
 Jesse Winchester (1944–2014), stage name of James Ridout Winchester, American musician
 James Winchester (American football) (born 1989), American football player
 James Ridout Winchester (1852–1941), bishop of the Episcopal Diocese of Arkansas